Connecticut's 142nd House district is one of 151 Connecticut House of Representatives districts. It is represented by Lucy Dathan. The district consists of parts of Norwalk and New Canaan, Connecticut.

List of representatives

Recent Election Results

2022

2020

See also 
 List of members of the Connecticut General Assembly from Norwalk

References

External links 
 Connecticut House District Map

142
Norwalk, Connecticut
Wilton, Connecticut